Callicoma is a plant genus that contains just one species, Callicoma serratifolia,  a tall shrub or small tree which is native to Australia. Callicoma serratifolia is commonly known as black wattle. One explanation for the name is the similarity of the flowers to those of Australian Acacia, which are commonly known as wattles. Another is its use in wattle and daub huts of the early settlers. The species has a number of other common names include callicoma, butterwood, silver leaf, silver-leaf butterwood and wild quince.

Description
Black wattle can grow up to 20 metres in height, though in cultivation it is more likely to reach a height of between 6 and 10 metres with a 3-metre spread. It has lanceolate or elliptic leaves that grow up to 12 cm long and 5 cm wide with coarsely serrate margins. The upper side of the leaves are dark green, while the lower sides are white due to the presence of fine, white hairs. The pale-yellow globular flower heads appear in late spring and early summer (November to December in Australia). These average 1.5 cm in diameter and have 1 to 2 cm long stalks.

Taxonomy
The first published description of the species, in 1809,  is attributed to Henry Cranke Andrews.

Distribution
It occurs within, and on the edges of, rainforest  in near-coastal areas within New South Wales and south-east Queensland, mostly along drainage lines or near creeks.

References

PlantNET: New South Wales Flora Online: Callicoma serratifolia

Flora of New South Wales
Flora of Queensland
Cunoniaceae
Monotypic Oxalidales genera
Oxalidales of Australia
Trees of Australia
Taxa named by Henry Cranke Andrews